The National Taiwan Arts Education Center is an educational center in Taipei Botanical Garden, Zhongzheng District, Taipei, Taiwan.

History
The center was originally built inside the Taipei Botanical Garden in 1956. It was then opened on 29 March 1957 as National Center of Arts. On 23 October 1985, it changed its name to National Taiwan Arts Education Center.

Transportation
The educational center is accessible within walking distance west from Chiang Kai-shek Memorial Hall Station of the Taipei Metro.

See also
 List of tourist attractions in Taiwan

References

External links

 

1957 establishments in Taiwan
Art centers in Taipei
Buildings and structures completed in 1957
Education in Taipei